The David S. Mack Sports and Exhibition Complex, also known as Mack Sports Complex, or just "The Mack" for short, is a 5,023-seat multi-purpose arena in Hempstead, New York. Replacing the Hofstra Physical Fitness Center, the arena opened on January 2, 2000, as Hofstra Arena and was renamed for Mack in 2006.

Basketball
It is home to the Hofstra University Pride men's and women's basketball teams, as well as the nationally ranked Pride wrestling team. It hosted the 2000 and 2001 title games of the America East Conference men's basketball tournaments, and also hosted two Postseason NIT games in 2006 (against Nebraska of the Big Twelve, and Old Dominion of the CAA).  In 2006, Hofstra Arena was renamed the 'David S. Mack Sports and Exhibition Complex'. Hofstra belongs to the CAA (Colonial Athletic Association). Before an overtime loss to Drexel University in February, the Pride had previously won 28 consecutive regular season home games at the Mack. The Mack was also home to the nation's second longest home win streak (behind Gonzaga University) in 2006, before the Pride's NIT Quarterfinals loss to Old Dominion University. Hofstra University Men's Basketball has developed an excellent fan base on Long Island, especially in Nassau County, as it continues to have winning seasons year after year.

Other events
Mack Sports Complex also hosts other events year round, such as college fairs, graduations and Kellenberg Memorial High School's Blue and Gold Sports Night.  "The Mack" also hosted the final Presidential Debate of the 2008 U.S. Presidential election between Republican John McCain and Democrat Barack Obama as well as the town hall format of the second Presidential Debate of the 2012 Presidential election between Republican Mitt Romney and incumbent President Barack Obama. On September 26, 2016, it hosted the first Presidential Debate of the 2016 election between Republican Donald Trump and Democrat Hillary Clinton.

See also
 List of NCAA Division I basketball arenas

References

External links
Mack Sports Complex - GoHofstra.com

Basketball venues in New York (state)
Wrestling venues in New York (state)
College basketball venues in the United States
College wrestling venues in the United States
Hofstra Pride basketball
Sports venues in Hempstead, New York
Sports venues in Nassau County, New York
Sports venues in Long Island
Sports venues completed in 2000
2000 establishments in New York (state)